Charles Judd may refer to:

 Charles Hastings Judd (1835–1890), Hawaiian politician and chamberlain
 Charles Hubbard Judd (1873–1946), American educational psychologist
 Charles Judd (politician) (1900–1973), member of the Wisconsin State Assembly
 Charles M. Judd, American psychologist
 Charles Henry Judd (1842–1919), British Protestant missionary to China